

Sovereign states

A
 Abkhazia – Principality of Abkhazia
 Ahom – Ahom Kingdom
 Ajaigarh – Ajaigarh State
 Alipura – Alipura State
 Alirajpur
 Alwar - Kingdom of Alwar
 Andorra - Principality of Andorra
 Angul
 Ankole – Kingdom of Ankole
 Annam – Empire of Annam
 Anziku – Anziku Kingdom
 Aro – Aro Confederacy
 – Ashanti Empire / Asante Union
 Athgarh

B
 Baguirmi – Kingdom of Baguirmi
 Bambara – Bambara Empire
 Baol – Kingdom of Baol
 Benin – Benin Empire
 Bhutan – Kingdom of Bhutan
 Bornu – Bornu Empire
 Brunei – Sultanate of Brunei
 Buganda – Kingdom of Buganda
 Bukhara – Emirate of Bukhara
 Bunyoro – Kingdom of Bunyoro-Kitara
 Burma – Kingdom of Burma
 Burundi – Kingdom of Burundi

C
 Cambodia – Kingdom of Cambodia
 Cayor – Kingdom of Cayor
 Champasak – Kingdom of Champasak
 China – Great Qing Empire
 Cospaia – Republic of Cospaia

D
 Dahomey – Kingdom of Dahomey
 Denmark-Norway – United Kingdoms of Denmark and Norway
 Durrani – Durrani Empire

E
 Ethiopia – Ethiopian Empire

F
 Fiji – Tui Viti
 France – French Republic
 Futa Jallon – Almamyate of Futa Jallon
 Futa Toro – Almamyate of Futa Toro

G
 Garo – Kingdom of Garo
 Gomma – Kingdom of Gomma
 Gozo – The Gozitan Nation
 Great Britain
Gumma – Kingdom of Gumma

H
 Hawaii – Kingdom of Hawaii
 Holy Roman Empire – Holy Roman Empire of the German Nation
 Habsburg – Habsburg Monarchy
 Austria – Archduchy of Austria
 Bohemia – Kingdom of Bohemia
 Croatia – Kingdom of Croatia
 Hungary – Kingdom of Hungary
 Transylvania – Principality of Transylvania
 Anhalt-Bernburg – Duchy of Anhalt-Bernburg
 Anhalt-Dessau – Duchy of Anhalt-Dessau
 Anhalt-Köthen – Duchy of Anhalt-Köthen
 Baden – Margraviate of Baden
 Bavaria – Electorate of Bavaria
 Hamburg – Free and Hanseatic City of Hamburg
 Hesse-Darmstadt – Landgraviate of Hesse-Darmstadt
 Hesse-Homburg – Landgraviate of Hesse-Homburg
 Hesse-Kassel – Landgraviate of Hesse-Kassel
 Hohenzollern-Hechingen – Hohenzollern-Hechingen
 Hohenzollern-Sigmaringen – Hohenzollern-Sigmaringen
 Liechtenstein – Principality of Liechtenstein
 Lippe – Principality of Lippe
 Lübeck – Free and Hanseatic City of Lübeck
 Nassau-Usingen – Nassau-Usingen
 Nassau-Weilburg – (Princely) County of Nassau-Weilburg
 Orange-Nassau – Principality of Orange-Nassau
 Reuss Elder Line – Principality of Reuss Elder Line
 Reuss Younger Line – Imperial County of Reuss
 Saxony – Electorate of Saxony
 Württemberg – Duchy of Württemberg

I
 – Kingdom of Ireland

J
 Janjero – Kingdom of Janjero
 Japan – Tokugawa shogunate
 Jimma – Kingdom of Jimma
 Johor – Johor Sultanate
 Jolof – Jolof Kingdom

K
 Kaabu – Kingdom of Kaabu
 Kaffa – Kingdom of Kaffa
 Kénédougou – Kénédougou Kingdom
 Khasso – Kingdom of Khasso
 Khiva – Khanate of Khiva
 Kokand – Khanate of Kokand
 Kong – Kong Empire
 Kongo – Kingdom of Kongo
 →  Korea – Kingdom of Joseon
 Koya Temne – Kingdom of Koya
 Kuba – Kingdom of Kuba

L
 Loango – Kingdom of Loango
 Luba – Luba Empire
 Lunda – Lunda Empire

M
 Maldives – Sultanate of Maldives
 Manipur – Kingdom of Manipur
 Mindanao – Sultanate of Maguindanao
 Moldavia – Principality of Moldavia
 Monaco – Principality of Monaco
 Montenegro – Prince-Bishopric of Montenegro
 Morocco – Kingdom of Morocco
 Mthethwa Paramountcy

N
 Nakhicheva – Nakhichevan Khanate
 Nepal – Kingdom of Nepal
 Northern Italy – Cisalpine Republic

O
 Ottoman Empire – Sublime Ottoman State
  Deylik of Algiers (Quasi-independent)
  Regency of Tripolitania (Quasi-independent)
 Ouaddai – Ouaddai Empire
 Oyo – Oyo Empire

P
 Pahang – Sultanate of Pahang
 Papal States – States of the Church
 Perak – Sultanate of Perak
 Persia – Persian (Qajar) Empire
 Portugal – Kingdom of Portugal
 Prussia – Kingdom of Prussia
 Punjab – Sikh Empire
Slelatus Dynasty

R
 Rapa Nui – Kingdom of Rapa Nui
 Russia – Russian Empire
 Rwanda – Kingdom of Rwanda
 Ryukyu – Kingdom of Ryukyu

S
 Samoa – Kingdom of Samoa
 San Marino – Most Serene Republic of San Marino
 Sardinia – Kingdom of Sardinia
 Schleswig – Duchy of Schleswig
 Selangor – Sultanate of Selangor
 Septinsular Republic
 Siam (Rattanakosin) – Kingdom of Siam
Sikkim – Chogyalate of Sikkim
 Spain – Kingdom of Spain
 Sweden – Kingdom of Sweden
 Sulu – Sultanate of Sulu

T
 Tahiti – Kingdom of Tahiti
 Tonga – Tu'i Tonga
 Tuscany – Grand Duchy of Tuscany
 Two Sicilies – Kingdom of the Two Sicilies

U
 – United States of America
 Upper Yafa – Sultanate of Upper Yafa

W
 Wallachia – Principality of Wallachia
 Welayta – Kingdom of Welayta

Non-sovereign territories

Great Britain
 – Cape of Good Hope

States claiming sovereignty
 Aceh – Aceh Sultanate
 Couto Misto
 Goust – Republic of Goust
 Muskogee – State of Muskogee

References